Gaming Innovation Group Inc. (usually styled GiG) is an iGaming company offering cloud-based product and platform services and performance marketing to its B2B partners. The company is listed on the Oslo Stock Exchange under the ticker symbol "GIG", and on Nasdaq Stockholm under the ticker symbol "GIGSEK".

GiG is a full-service iGaming software services provider and media partner for online gambling operators and has progressively expanded into most segments of the supplier value chain in iGaming: performance-based/affiliate marketing (GiG Media, formerly known as Innovation Labs Ltd.), software platform services (GiG Core), formerly known as iGaming Cloud, and sportsbook (GiG Sports and the recent acquisition of Sportnco).

The company has previously operated several consumer brands, including Rizk.com and Guts.com, before divesting them to Betsson in April 2020. The company's platform of services is licensed by the MGA, UKGC and offered under a TW issued by the DGE in New Jersey. It is certified in Sweden, Spain, Iowa (USA), Croatia and Latvia, and is also compliant with GLI33 and GLI16 platform standards and ISO27001 for GiG Core and GiG Data.

History

Early years and 2010s 
Gaming Innovation Group Ltd. was initially incorporated in 2008 as Donkr International Ltd. in Malta.

In 2012, Guts Gaming Ltd. (now MT SecureTrade Limited) was incorporated as a fully owned Gaming Innovation Group Ltd subsidiary. In May 2013, the company launched Guts.com, a website offering sports betting and casino games.

In early 2015,  iGamingCloud Ltd., a B2B platform service for the iGaming industry, was launched (GiG Core). The product went live in February 2015. In the same month, Gaming Innovation Group and Nio Inc. signed iGaming Cloud and sportsbook (GiG Sports) supported by GiG's fully managed services.

In May 2015, Optimizer Invest acquired 10% of iGaming Cloud Ltd for consideration of €1m. In addition, there was a Share Exchange Agreement to exchange the entire issued share capital of Gaming Innovation Group PLC. for shares in Nio Inc. Subsequently, Nio inc. adopted the name of Gaming Innovation Group Inc. and appointed Robin Reed as its new CEO. The month after, Gaming Innovation Group was listed on the Oslo Stock Exchange.

The company expanded into the affiliate industry in iGaming by a series of acquisitions. GiG subsidiary Innovation Labs (GiG Media) acquired affiliate network Spaseeba for 27m GiG shares. GiG Media also acquired affiliate networks in respectively Finland and Estonia.

In January 2016 the company launched the B2C casino brand Rizk.com. Later on in March, the company acquired the sports betting company OddsModel AS for consideration of 21.74 million new Shares. In June 2016 Gaming Innovation Group acquired Betit Holdings adding the three iGaming operators Kaboo.com, SuperLenny.com, and Thrills.com to its portfolio of B2C focused brands (notably Rizk.com and Guts.com before the Betit acquisition). As part of the deal, Optimizer Invest increased its ownership of GiG shares. The company also continued its expansion within the media business by acquiring Dutch affiliate network Delta Markets B.V. as well as Swedish affiliate network Magenti Media.

In 2017, GiG acquired the technology-driven performance marketing company Rebel Penguin ApS for a total amount of €13 million. This acquisition concluded GiG Media being established as a multi-channel affiliate, operating both a publishing unit (organic rankings on search engines) as well as a paid marketing unit. A new B2C brand called Highroller was also launched.

2018 was the signing of a deal with Hard Rock Casino, with an initial launch in Atlantic City, New Jersey. The company also launched its marketing compliance tool targeted at the online gambling segment, GiG Comply. An in-house sportsbook on Rizk.com was launched just ahead of the 2018 FIFA World Cup. During the year of 2018, GiG obtained a betting license in the German State Schleswig-Holstein which makes part of the DACH region, a key growth region for the organisation and its Rizk brand. E-sports hub GLHF.GG was signed on GiG Core as well as Sia Mr. Green Latvia for the provision of platform license, online casino, sportsbook, and front end services.

In January 2019, GiG launched the Hard Rock omnichannel in New Jersey. On 26 March 2019, the company began trading on the Nasdaq Stockholm under the ticker symbol 'GIGSEK'. GiG Core also signed Metalcasino to its sportsbook offering. An agreement to provide MegaLotto with GiG's technical platform and casino games were also signed. In August 2019, Gaming Innovation Group sold its HighRoller brand to Ellmount Gaming, stating that their core focus will be primarily on growing Rizk as a casino brand and Guts as a sports betting brand. The HighRoller brand was sold for approx. €7m (3.5 PV).

During the year of 2019, Kindred Group was signed on the new GiG Comply product. The company also partnered with Skycity, a market leader in New Zealand, for its online casino platform. In September 2019, GiG launched its digital and retail sportsbook with Hard Rock Cafe International in Iowa.

2020s 
In April 2020, Gaming Innovation Group divested its B2C operations to Betsson, for a total of €31m with a premium fee on the platform service. From this point onwards, the intention is to be a purely B2B company, focused on its platform services (GiG Core) as well as its media/affiliate services (GiG Media).

In June 2020, GiG signed a long-term agreement with GS Technologies Limited for the provision of GiG's platform and front-end development to a new casino brand with its license from the Maltese Gaming Authority. In the following month, the company signed an agreement with  K.A.K. DOO Skopje, Hospitality, tourism, and services company (K.A.K.) for the provision of GiG's platform, front-end development, and managed media services to launch their digital operation in the regulated North Macedonian market. In the same month, GiG subsidiary iGaming Cloud Inc. was granted a permanent casino service industry enterprise license (CSIE) from the Division of Gaming Enforcement (DGE) in New Jersey, United States. The application was filed in June 2018 with GiG supporting Hard Rock International's casino operations in New Jersey under a so-called transactional waiver until the final approval was awarded.

GiG signed a long-term agreement with a subsidiary of Casumo, Mill of Magic Ltd, for the provision of GiG's platform, data platform, and GiG Logic in July 2020. Mill of Magic will use GiG's products to power its new Pay N Play casino offering under its license from the Maltese Gaming Authority.

In August 2020, GiG signed the head of terms agreement with Grupo Slots LOTBA S.E, Argentina's premier gaming and entertainment group. In September, GiG and Betgenius signed a deal to join forces in a global sportsbook platform deal.

In February 2021, the company signed a long term agreement with PlayStar Casino to enter New Jersey. That year, GiG obtained ISO 27001:2021 certification for the Frontend development solution and content management system, covering development, network configuration, infrastructure and associated product operations for frontend, middleware and backend Gaming services hosted on GiG’s infrastructure. In May, the company won Full-Service Platform of the year at EGR iGaming awards and Top 3 in EGR Power Affiliates 2021.

GiG also issued a new 3-year SEK 450 million senior secured bond with a SEK 550 million borrowing limit. The transaction was oversubscribed and received strong demand from investors across the Nordics, continental Europe, and the US, with participation in the placement from existing and new investors. In June, PlayStar Casino agreement was extended to cover the burgeoning Pennsylvanian market. In December, the company signed a long-term agreement to provide the Platform with Rank Holdings for their Marina888 brand. A share purchase agreement was announced to purchase Sportnco, a specialist in online sports betting.

Present day 
In April 2020, GiG signed an agreement with Betway to provide Sportnco’s sportsbook and player account management in Portugal. The same month, Sportnco acquisition is completed in a €51.5 deal. GiG Media won the iGB Affiliate award for Casino affiliate of the year at the 2022 event in London. In May 2022, the company signed an agreement with Full Games SA to provide player management and sports betting services in Angola, a new regulated market.

Organizational structure 
Gaming Innovation Group Inc. (GIG) is a publicly traded US corporation, incorporated in the state of Delaware with its registered offices at 10700 Stringfellow Rd. 10, Bokeelia, FL 33922, Florida, USA, where accounting is located. GiG has been registered in the Norwegian company registry as a “Norwegian Registered Foreign Entity”(NUF) with the organization number 988 015 849. It has also been registered as a branch in the Malta Business Registry, under Registration No: 2309086.

GIG is a holding company, with all commercial activities being carried out by its subsidiaries. GIG has subsidiaries located in Malta, Denmark, Gibraltar and Spain. Some of the subsidiaries based in Malta hold remote operator licences in the UK, Malta and Sweden. Furthermore, the two main segments of the business (GIG Media and GIG Core) are operated as follows: GIG Media is operated through Innovation Labs Ltd (a Malta based subsidiary) and iGamingCloud Inc. (a US based subsidiary), and GIG Core is mainly operated through iGamingCloud Limited (a Malta based subsidiary).

Business units 
Gaming Innovation Group operates two overall business units both focusing on the B2B Business-to-business market in iGaming. The platform division (GiG Core) develops digital products and offers managed services to online and land-based gaming companies. Focused on Casino and Sports, products include Player Account Management, Frontend, CMS, Data, Sports and Managed Services. It is licensed in Malta, UK, New Jersey (USA), Spain and Sweden.

The media division (GiG Media) focuses on generating leads to operators in iGaming. GiG Media operates several media websites and traffic generating channels engaging the end-user, turning users into leads to operators. Notable websites that GiG Media operates are askgamblers.com, superlenny.com, casinotopsonline.com, and wsn.com.

World Sports Network (WSN.com) 
Through its sports website, WSN.com, Gaming Innovation Group entered the regulated US sports betting market in January 2019. It was first granted a license to operate in New Jersey, followed by Indiana, Pennsylvania, Colorado and West Virginia. In June 2020, WSN.com started an online gambling podcast with sports betting personality Bill Krackomberger.

Casinotopsonline.com 
GiG acquired Casinotopsonline.com in March 2017 for the amount of €11.5 million, at the time it was deemed as one of Europe's largest online casino review portals. The site focuses on news and casino reviews operating on a worldwide scale.

SuperLenny.com 
The website SuperLenny.com was part of the Betit Holdings acquisition performed by GiG in June 2016. SuperLenny.com started as a casino brand with a Scandinavian focus but was later changed into an affiliate focused website driving traffic and leads to operators.

AskGamblers.com 
In January 2023, AskGamblers.com was acquired by GiG for €45 million ($47.8 million). The casino affiliate website features a player complaint resolution service through which $52.4 million has been returned to injured parties, as of February 2023. AskGamblers.com hosts the annual AskGamblers Awards during which the best casinos, slot releases, software providers, and affiliate partners are awarded, and a charity auction, traditionally held the night before the event. In 2021, €65,300 was raised and diverted to UNICEF's project Mitigating the Effects of the COVID-19 Pandemic on the Socio-Economic Status of Children and Their Families.

Sportnco 
In April 2022, GiG announced the completion of a €51.5m acquisition of online sports betting provider Sportnco to complement both companies existing commercial profiles and offer significantly increased capacity for expansion into short- and long-term addressable markets.

Sportnco currently has around 40 partners working in 12 countries across Europe and Latin America and is currently being launched in new regions in North America. It has offices in Madrid, Toulouse and Barcelona, and currently employs around 130 people.

Sportnco started in 2008 in the world of online sports betting for regulated markets, starting in France and then coming to Spain. The company developed its own betting platform, covering more than 50 sports. It currently operates B2B betting networks in Spain and France, and is active in other European jurisdictions like Portugal, Belgium and Greece, as well as in South America and the United States. Since its launch, the company has developed a responsible gaming policy and is therefore only present in regulated markets.

Licences and certificates 

GiG's software platform has been certified in Latvia, Croatia, Spain, Sweden and Iowa. By virtue of partnerships GiG has entered into with operators, GiG provides its software platform services in these regulated markets.

Financial data

See also 
 List of companies listed on the Oslo Stock Exchange

References

External links

Online poker companies
Online gambling companies of Malta
Companies listed on the Oslo Stock Exchange